The Fort de Flémalle is one of twelve forts built around Liège, Belgium, in the late 19th century. The overall Fortified Position of Liège was a constituent part of the country's National Redoubt. Fort de Flémalle was built between 1881 and 1884 according to the plans of General Henri Alexis Brialmont. Contrasting with the French forts built in the same era by Raymond Adolphe Séré de Rivières, the fort was built exclusively of unreinforced concrete, a new material, rather than masonry. The fort was heavily bombarded by German artillery in the Battle of Liège. Attacked in both World War I and World War II, the fort has been preserved as a museum.

Description
Flémalle overlooks the Meuse valley upstream from Liège.

The fort was built as an irregular trapezoid, almost triangular. The principal armament was concentrated in the central massif. The ditches were defended in enfilade by 57 mm guns in casemates resembling counterscarp batteries, firing at shot traps at the other end of the ditch. The fort is one of the larger Liège forts.

With the exception of the Fort de Loncin, the Belgian forts made little provision for the daily needs of their wartime garrisons, locating latrines, showers, kitchens and the morgue in the fort's counterscarp, a location that would be untenable in combat. This would have profound effects on the forts' ability to endure a long assault. The service areas were placed directly opposite the barracks, which opened into the ditch in the rear of the fort (i.e., in the face towards Liège), with lesser protection than  the two "salient" sides. The Brialmont forts placed a weaker side to the rear to allow for recapture by Belgian forces from the rear, and located the barracks and support facilities on this side, using the rear ditch for light and ventilation of living spaces. In combat heavy shellfire made the rear ditch untenable, and German forces were able to get between the forts and attack them from the rear.

The Brialmont forts were designed to be protected from shellfire equaling their heaviest guns: 21 cm. The top of the central massif used  of unreinforced concrete, while the caserne walls, judged to be less exposed, used . Under fire, the forts were damaged by 21 cm fire and could not withstand heavier artillery.

Armament
Flémalle's armament included two turrets with a single 21 cm Krupp gun, a 15cm turret with twin guns and two 12 cm turret with two Krupp guns, all for distant targets. Four 57 mm gun turrets were provided for local defense. The fort also mounted an observation turret with a searchlight. Eleven rapid-fire 57 mm guns were provided in casemates for the defense of the ditches and the postern.

The fort's heavy guns were German, typically Krupp, while the turret mechanisms were from a variety of sources. The fort was provided with signal lights to permit communication with the neighboring Fort de Loncin and Fort de Liers. The guns were fired using black powder rather than smokeless powder, producing choking gas in the confined firing spaces that spread throughout the fort.

First World War

In 1914 Flémalle was commanded by Captain-Commandant Falize with five officers and 150 men. Liège first came under attack on 6 August 1914. When the Liège's fortifications proved unexpectedly stubborn, the Germans brought heavy siege artillery to bombard the forts with shells far larger than they were designed to resist. Flémalle was one of the last forts to come under heavy bombardment, and was the last of the Liėge forts to surrender. Following the explosion of the Fort de Loncin, the Germans sent delegations to the last two holdouts, Flémalle and the Fort de Hollogne, emphasisizing the consequences of continued resistance. Flémalle surrendered at 0930 on 16 August, two hours after Hollogne.

Fortified Position of Liège
Flémalles armament was upgraded in the 1930s to become part of the Fortified Position of Liège II, which was planned to deter a German incursion over the nearby border. The armament was upgraded with new guns in the turrets and an anti-aircraft battery. This was accompanied by improvements to ventilation, protection, sanitary facilities, communications and electrical power. Armament included a machine gun turret, a twin 105mm gun turret, a turret with a single 150mm gun, and four single 75mm guns in retractable turrets. The 57mm guns were replaced with machine guns. Six anti-aircraft guns were also provided.

Second World War
In 1940 Flémalle was commanded by Captain-Commandant Barbieux, with five officers and about 150 men. Following the successful German assault on Fort Eben-Emael to the east, Flémalle provided fire support for Belgian field units for the next few days. On 15 May the fort came under aerial bombing attack, destroying the gun turrets. The next day German ground forces attacked. Unable to mount an effective resistance, the fort surrendered.

Present
Flémalle was partly stripped of its equipment during the German occupation, and again by a salvager in the 1960s. The fort has been maintained by a preservation association since 1992, which has established a museum in the fort.

References

Bibliography 
Donnell, Clayton, The Forts of the Meuse in World War I, Osprey Publishing, Oxford, 2007, .
Kauffmann, J.E., Jurga, R., Fortress Europe: European Fortifications of World War II, Da Capo Press, USA, 2002, .

External links 

 Fort de Flémalle at fortiff.be

Flemalle
Flemalle
Infrastructure completed in 1884
World War I museums in Belgium
Museums in Liège Province
Flémalle